Edo traditional food consists of dishes or food items common among the people of Edo State. The State is home to various ethnic groups including the  Binis (or Edos), Ishan (Esan), Afemai, Etsako and others. The Traditional food found among these people usually involves soup and swallow. 'swallow' is a term for Nigerian meals that are taken with soup and ingested without chewing (Although there are few people who are actually chew before swallowing).

While the 'swallows' are common among most ethnic groups in Nigeria. The soups are unique to different ethnic group. the following are some of the native cuisines popular among Edo people.

Bini owo soup

This is one simple soup eaten by the Edos. The soup is quite different in content from the owo (or Owho) of Urhobo people in southern Nigeria. It is prepare with palm oil, smoked fish and potash (Okawu or kan). The Potash is meant to give it a thick texture. It is usually served with yam, cocoyam or unripe plantain.

Groundnut soup

This another popular cousine  among the Etsakor people of Edo State. The groundnut soup is locally called Omisagwe. it involves a blend of ground nut (peanuts), tomatoes, onions and a variety of meats such as chicken, beef or chevron. The soup is usually served with fufu, pounded yam, garri (Eba) or starch.

Corn soup

Corn soup is a native soup of  Afemai people in Edo State. This cuisine is locally called  omi ukpoka. It a blend of corn with smoked fish and green leaf. It is usually served with swallow such as; fufu, eba or pounded yam.

Black soup

This is particularly common among the Ishan (Esan). the local name for this nutritious soup is 'Omoebe soup'. The soup is a blend of bitter leaf and other vegetable including scent leaf (Effirin). The mixture of these vegetables gives the soup a dark colour. it usually served with starch pounded yam, eba and fufu.

See also

 West African cuisine
 List of African cuisines

References

External links
Food in Nigeria

 
West African cuisine